Ion Barbu (pen name of Dan Barbilian; 18 March 1895 –11 August 1961) was a Romanian mathematician and poet. His name is associated with the Mathematics Subject Classification number 51C05, which is a major posthumous recognition reserved only to pioneers of investigations in an area of mathematical inquiry.

Early life
Born in Câmpulung-Muscel, Argeș County, he was the son of Constantin Barbilian and Smaranda, born Șoiculescu. He attended elementary school in Câmpulung, Dămienești, and Stâlpeni, and for secondary studies he went to the Ion Brătianu High School in Pitești, the Dinicu Golescu High School in Câmpulung, and finally the Gheorghe Lazăr High School and the Mihai Viteazul High School in Bucharest. During that time, he discovered that he had a talent for mathematics, and started publishing in Gazeta Matematică; it was also then that he discovered his passion for poetry. Barbu was known as "one of the greatest Romanian poets of the twentieth century and perhaps the greatest of all" according to Romanian literary critic Alexandru Ciorănescu. As a poet, he is known for his volume Joc secund ("Mirrored Play").

He was a student at the University of Bucharest when World War I caused his studies to be interrupted by military service. He completed his degree in 1921. He then went to the University of Göttingen to study number theory with Edmund Landau for two years. Returning to Bucharest, he studied with Gheorghe Țițeica, completing in 1929 his thesis, Canonical representation of the addition of hyperelliptic functions.

Achievements in mathematics

Apollonian metric
In 1934, Barbilian published his article describing metrization of a region K, the interior of a simple closed curve J. Let xy denote the Euclidean distance from x to y. Barbilian's function for the distance from a to b in K is

At the University of Missouri in 1938 Leonard Blumenthal wrote Distance Geometry. A Study of the Development of Abstract Metrics, where he used the term "Barbilian spaces" for metric spaces based on Barbilian's function to obtain their metric. And in 1954 the American Mathematical Monthly published an article by Paul J. Kelly on Barbilian's method of metrizing a region bounded by a curve. Barbilian claimed he did not have access to Kelly's publication, but he did read Blumenthal's review of it in Mathematical Reviews and he understood Kelly's construction. This motivated him to write in final form a series of four papers, which appeared after 1958, where the metric geometry of the spaces that today bears his name is investigated thoroughly.

He answered in 1959 with an article which described "a very general procedure of metrization through which the positive functions of two points, on certain sets, can be refined to a distance." Besides Blumenthal and Kelly, articles on "Barbilian spaces" have appeared in the 1990s from Patricia Souza, while  Wladimir G. Boskoff, Marian G. Ciucă and Bogdan Suceavă wrote in the 2000s about "Barbilian's metrization procedure".  Barbilian indicated in his paper Asupra unui principiu de metrizare that he preferred the term "Apollonian metric space", and articles from Alan F. Beardon, Frederick Gehring and Kari Hag, Peter A. Häströ, Zair Ibragimov and others use that term. According to Suceavă, "Barbilian's metrization procedure is important for at least three reasons: (1) It yields a natural generalization of Poincaré and Beltrami-Klein's hyperbolic geometries; (2) It has been studied in the context of the study of Apollonian metric; (3) Provides a large class of examples of Lagrange generalized metrics irreducible to Riemann, Finsler, or Lagrange metrics."

Ring geometry
Barbilian made a contribution to the foundations of geometry with his articles in 1940 and 1941 in Jahresbericht der Deutschen Mathematiker-Vereinigung on projective planes with coordinates from a ring. According to Boskoff and Suceavă, this work "inspired research in ring geometries, nowadays associated with his, Hjelmslev's and Klingenberg's names."
A more critical stance was taken in 1995 by Ferdinand D. Velkamp: 
A systematic study of projective planes over large classes of associative rings was initiated by D. Barbilian. His very general approach in [1940 and 41] remained rather unsatisfactory, however, his axioms were partly of a geometric nature, partly algebraic as pertaining to the ring of coordinates, and there were a number of difficulties which Barbilian could not overcome.
Nevertheless, in 1989 John R. Faulkner wrote an article "Barbilian Planes" that clarified terminology and advanced the study. In his introduction, he wrote:
A classical result from projective geometry is that a Desarguesian projective plane is coordinatized by an associative division ring. A Barbilian plane is a geometric structure which extends the notion of a projective plane and thereby allows a coordinate ring which is not necessarily a division ring. There are advantages ...

Works
 1956: , Bucharest. 
 1960: , Bucharest.

Academic career
In 1942, Barbilian was named professor at the University of Bucharest, with some help from fellow mathematician Grigore Moisil.

As a mathematician, Barbilian authored 80 research papers and studies. His last paper, written in collaboration with Nicolae Radu, appeared posthumously, in 1962, and is the last in the cycle of four works where he investigates the Apollonian metric.

Political creed
Barbu was mostly apolitical, with one exception: around 1940 he became a sympathizer of the fascist movement The Iron Guard (hoping to get a professorship if they came to power), dedicating some poems to one of its leaders, Corneliu Zelea Codreanu. In 1940, he also wrote a poem praising Hitler.

Death and legacy

Ion Barbu died in Bucharest in 1961, and is buried at Bellu Cemetery.

The Ion Barbu Theoretical High School in Pitești, the Ion Barbu Technological High School in Giurgiu, and the Dan Barbilian Theoretical High School in Câmpulung are all named after him.

Presence in English language anthologies 
 Born in Utopia - An anthology of Modern and Contemporary Romanian Poetry - Carmen Firan and Paul Doru Mugur (editors) with Edward Foster - Talisman House Publishers - 2006 - 
 Testament - Anthology of Romanian Verse - American Edition - monolingual English language edition - Daniel Ioniță (editor and principal translator) with Eva Foster, Daniel Reynaud and Rochelle Bews - Australian-Romanian Academy for Culture - 2017 - 
 Testment – 400 Years of Romanian Poetry – 400 de ani de poezie românească – bilingual edition – Daniel Ioniță (editor and principal translator) with Daniel Reynaud, Adriana Paul & Eva Foster – Editura Minerva, 2019 – 
 Romanian Poetry from its Origins to the Present – bilingual edition English/Romanian – Daniel Ioniță (editor and principal translator) with Daniel Reynaud, Adriana Paul and Eva Foster – Australian-Romanian Academy Publishing – 2020 –  ;

References

1895 births
1961 deaths
People from Câmpulung
Gheorghe Lazăr National College (Bucharest) alumni
University of Bucharest alumni
Academic staff of the University of Bucharest
Romanian avant-garde
Romanian male poets
20th-century Romanian inventors
Romanian textbook writers
20th-century Romanian mathematicians
20th-century Romanian poets
20th-century Romanian male writers
Pseudonymous mathematicians
Members of the Romanian Academy elected posthumously
Members of the Romanian Academy of Sciences
Burials at Bellu Cemetery
Geometers
20th-century pseudonymous writers